A Long Petal of the Sea is a 2019 novel by Chilean author Isabel Allende. Originally published in Spain by Plaza & Janés, it was first published in the United States by Vintage Espanol. The novel was issued in 2019 in Spanish as Largo pétalo de mar, and was translated into English by Nick Caistor and Amanda Hopkinson. Based on a real story, it is set partly during the Spanish Civil War and partly in Chile where the protagonists again witness the fight between freedom and repression. A Long Petal of the Sea became the most popular book in Spain between April 2019 and April 2020.

Plot
The story opens during the Spanish Civil War in Barcelona where the protagonist, Victor Dalmau, has left his medical studies to help the Republicans against the Fascist forces of General Franco. His brother, Guillem, is also a Republican soldier, but he dies in the Battle of Ebro. Victor has to seek the help of his Basque friend, Aitor Ibarra, to send his mother and Guillem's wife, Roser, to France, as the victory of Franco's forces is becoming more and more certain. After many trials, he reunites with Roser in France, and they hear that Winnipeg, a ship chartered by the poet Pablo Neruda, is going to take a certain number of Spanish refugees to Chile. Desperate to grab the chance, Victor and Roser get married reluctantly to qualify for the journey.
They embark on this journey, but migration to the new country is not the end of their problem, and there again they are forced to witness the fight between freedom and repression, which seems to be a neverending war.

Reception
On the review aggregator website Book Marks, which assigns individual ratings to book reviews from mainstream literary critics, the novel received a cumulative "Positive" rating based on 20 reviews: 8 "Rave" reviews, 8 "Positive" reviews, 3 "Mixed" reviews, and 1 "Pan" review. Marcela Davison Avilés of NPR admires the "gifted stories" of Allende, noting that "A Long Petal of the Sea is a love story for these times. But it's not a story beholden to any era. Its call is immutable, like Neruda's hope". The Observer praises the skill with which Allende tells a story of "displacement", "a theme sharpened by her own life story". In her review for The New York Times, Paula McLain highlights the themes of this novel: "there is the sense that every human life is an odyssey, and that how and where we connect creates the fabric of our existence: the source of our humanity". Kirkus Reviews praises Allende's storytelling skill: "Allende tends to describe emotions and events rather than delve into them, and she paints the historical backdrop in very broad strokes, but she is an engaging storyteller".

References

External links
The Author's Website.

2019 Chilean novels
Novels by Isabel Allende
Novels set in Chile
Novels set in Spain
Chilean historical novels
Novels set during the Spanish Civil War